Sanit Khewhok (born 1944) is a painter, sculptor, curator, and conservator.

Early life and education
He was born in Trang, Thailand, in 1944, and, in 1969, graduated from Silpakorn University in Bangkok with a diploma in fine art.  He then studied at the Academy of Fine Arts in Rome, where he earned a master's degree in mural painting and Conservation-restoration in 1975.

Career

Khewhok was the curator of modern art at the National Gallery of Thailand in Bangkok from 1985 to 1986.  In 1985, he spent 100 days in a Thai monastery, and was ordained as a Buddhist monk.  After moving to Hawai'i in 1986, he worked at The Contemporary Museum, Honolulu (now the Honolulu Museum of Art Spalding House) as chief conservator and collections manager from 1988 to 2008.

He has had solo exhibitions at both The Contemporary Museum, Honolulu in 1989 and the Honolulu Museum of Art in 2010.  In 2010, he became the eleventh recipient of the Catharine E. B. Cox Award for Excellence in the Visual Arts.

Khewhok is best known for his miniature portraits, some painted on pills and wooden ice cream spoons.  His Edouard Manet from 1999 is a subtractive drawing in graphite on a used envelope.  One of the three stamps is also drawn in graphite.  He has exhibited miniature sculptures, including mixed media life-sized sculptures of insects.  The Hawaii State Art Museum and the Honolulu Museum of Art are among the public collections holding works by Khewhok.

References
 International Art Society of Hawai'i, Kuilima Kākou, Hawai’i-Japan Joint Exhibition, Honolulu, International Art Society of Hawai'i, 2004, p. 22
 Morse, Marcia and Allison Wong, 10 Years: The Contemporary Museum at First Hawaiian Center, The Contemporary Museum, Honolulu, 2006, p. 60
 Yoshihara, Lisa A., Collective Visions, Hawaii State Foundation on Culture and the Arts, Honolulu, 1997, p. 71.
 Wong, Allison, 10 Years - The Contemporary Museum at First Hawaiian Center - Tenth Anniversary Exhibition, The Contemporary Museum, Honolulu, Hawaii, 2006, p. 60

Footnotes

Living people
Modern sculptors
Sanit Khewhok
Sanit Khewhok
Sanit Khewhok
Sanit Khewhok
Painters from Hawaii
Sculptors from Hawaii
20th-century American painters
American male painters
21st-century American painters
American art curators
Artists from Honolulu
Conservator-restorers
1944 births
Sanit Khewhok
20th-century American sculptors
American male sculptors
20th-century American male artists